Ria is a New Zealand R&B/pop singer. She is best known for her singles "Over You" and "All My Ladies". She attended Auckland Girls Grammar School.

RIA started performing at a young age before progressing in her teens to leading an all-female band called Vivah, to becoming winners of the national Smokefree Pacifica Beats in 2007. RIA is a graduate from the Music & Audio Institute of NZ (MAINZ) and singing tutor at the Otara Music Centre (OMAC).

Discography

Singles

References 

Living people
People educated at Auckland Girls' Grammar School
Ria
Place of birth missing (living people)
Year of birth missing (living people)